Austin Morris (10 February 1913 – 1991) was an English professional footballer who played in the Football League for Mansfield Town.

References

1913 births
1991 deaths
English footballers
Association football midfielders
English Football League players
Gainsborough Trinity F.C. players
Mansfield Town F.C. players